The Snails' Senator is a 1995 Romanian comedy film directed by Mircea Daneliuc. It was entered into the 1995 Cannes Film Festival.

Cast
 Dorel Vișan - Senatorul Vartosu
 Cecilia Bârbora
 Clara Voda
 Madeleine Thibeault
 Dan Chisu
 Florin Zamfirescu
 Constanta Comanoiu
 Nicolae Albani
 Mircea Andreescu
 Dinu Apetrei
 Anda Caropol
 Viorel Comanici
 Camelia Zorlescu
 Flavius Constantinescu
 Viorica Geanta Chelbea (as Viorica Geanta)

References

External links

1995 films
1995 comedy films
Romanian comedy films
Romanian political films
1990s Romanian-language films
Romanian political satire films
Films directed by Mircea Daneliuc